Cardioglossa schioetzi is a species of frogs in the family Arthroleptidae. It is found in the mountains of Cameroon and eastern Nigeria. Specifically, it has been recorded from the Oshie-Obudu Range, Gotel Mountains, Mount Oku, and Mount Mbam. It is a generally poorly known species.

Etymology
The specific name schioetzi honours , a Danish herpetologist who has worked extensively on African tree frogs. Common name Acha Tugi long-fingered frog has been coined for this species (Acha Tugi is the type locality).

Description
Males measure  in snout–vent length; the upper limit for the males also represents the maximum size recorded for the species. There is a white line that runs under the eye, then curves sigmoidally up and terminates just behind the external naris. The characteristic dorsal blotches are not joined to form an hour-glass pattern.

Habitat and conservation
It can also occur in secondary vegetation where no trees remain. Some specimens have been found around streams, the presumed breeding habitat of this species.

This species is threatened by habitat loss caused by expanding agricultural activities, human settlements, overgrazing, and logging. It occurs in the Cross River National Park in Nigeria.

References

schioetzi
Frogs of Africa
Amphibians of West Africa
Amphibians of Cameroon
Fauna of Nigeria
Amphibians described in 1982
Taxa named by Jean-Louis Amiet
Taxonomy articles created by Polbot
Fauna of the Cameroonian Highlands forests